Xu Qin (January 1928 – 18 October 2021) was a Chinese politician who served as party secretary of Jiangxi from 1982 to 1985 and chairman of Jiangxi People's Congress from 1988 to 1993.

He was a delegate to the 5th, 6th, 7th and 8th National People's Congress. He was a member of the standing Committee of the 8th National People's Congress. He was a representative of the 14th National Congress of the Chinese Communist Party. He was an alternate member of the 12th Central Committee of the Chinese Communist Party.

Biography
Xu was born in Suizhong County, Fengtian, in January 1928, during the Republic of China. He joined the Chinese Communist Party in September 1949.

Xu got involved in politics in 1949, when he became a secretary in the Office of CCP Fuzhou Prefectural Party Committee. He then continued working in Linchuan County, holding positions as head of Publicity Department, head of Agriculture and Industry, deputy party secretary of the county, and party secretary of the county. In 1960, he was elevated to first secretary of Nancheng County, and held that office until 1967. He was eventually purged during the Cultural Revolution but later reinstated in 1971. After a year of studying at the Party School of the CCP Jiangxi Provincial Committee, he was admitted to member of the standing committee of the CCP Fuzhou Prefectural Party Committee, the prefecture's top authority. In 1975, he was made head of China's agricultural technology support team for Senegal, but having held the position for only two years. In October 1977, he rose to become party secretary of Fuzhou and in April 1979 was appointed deputy secretary-general of the CCP Jiangxi Provincial Committee and director of the Provincial Foreign Affairs Office. In December, he was appointed vice governor and secretary-general of Jiangxi and was admitted to member of the standing committee of the CCP Jiangxi Provincial Committee, the province's top authority. In December 1982, he took office as party secretary of Jiangxi, and served until June 1985. In February 1988, he moved up the ranks to chairman of Jiangxi People's Congress, the highest legislature in the province, serving until February 1993. He resigned in November 2000.

On 18 October 2021, he died from an illness in Nanchang, Jiangxi, aged 93.

Autobiography

References

1928 births
2021 deaths
People from Suizhong County
People's Republic of China politicians from Liaoning
Chinese Communist Party politicians from Liaoning
Delegates to the 5th National People's Congress
Delegates to the 6th National People's Congress
Delegates to the 7th National People's Congress
Delegates to the 8th National People's Congress
Members of the Standing Committee of the 8th National People's Congress
Alternate members of the 12th Central Committee of the Chinese Communist Party